Georgi Babaliev (Bulgarian: Георги Бабалиев; born 14 March 2001) is a Bulgarian professional footballer who plays as a forward.

Career
Babaliev started his youth career in the local Karnobat, before moving to Chernomorets Burgas and later to Ludogorets Razgrad. On 22 December 2020 he joined Lokomotiv Sofia, coming from an unsuccessful spell in Sozopol. In July 2021 he moved to Spartak Varna. The team won a promote to First League. On 22 July 2022 he scored Spartak's first goal for the season in the First League, in the 1:1 draw with Pirin Blagoevgrad.

References

External links
 

2001 births
Living people
Bulgarian footballers
PFC Ludogorets Razgrad II players
PFC Spartak Varna players
Association football midfielders
First Professional Football League (Bulgaria) players